Haivoron is a town in Holovanivsk Raion, Kirovohrad Oblast (region) of Ukraine. It hosts the administration of Haivoron urban hromada, one of the hromadas of Ukraine. Population: 

Haivoron is situated on the Southern Bug.

History 

Former village in Gaysin uyezd in Podolian Governorate of the Russian Empire.

In 1897 - 1898 a locomotive repair plant was built here.

During World War II, the settlement was occupied by Axis troops from July 29, 1941 to March 11, 1944.

Town since 1949.

In 1974, the technical school was transformed into a technical college.

In January 1989 population was 16 520 people. Also, in 1989 a new school was built here.

In 2013 population was 15 214 people.

Until 18 July 2020, Haivoron was the administrative center of Haivoron Raion. The raion was abolished in July 2020 as part of the administrative reform of Ukraine, which reduced the number of raions of Kirovohrad Oblast to four. The area of Haivoron Raion was merged into Holovanivsk Raion.

Climate

References
 

Cities in Kirovohrad Oblast
Cities of district significance in Ukraine
Populated places on the Southern Bug